The Da Costa Book of Hours is a 1515 illuminated manuscript book of hours, now in the Morgan Library and Museum in New York. It was produced by Simon Bening and his workshop, possibly for a member of the Portuguese Sá family, before later belonging to Álvaro da Costa, an advisor to Manuel I of Portugal.

References

16th-century illuminated manuscripts
Illuminated books of hours
Collection of the Morgan Library & Museum